Live in Berlin is a live album by the Art Ensemble of Chicago recorded in March 1979 and first released on the West Wind label in 1991.

Track listing 
Disc One
 "As If It Were The Seasons/A Jackson In Your House/Crushed" (Joseph Jarman/Roscoe Mitcell/Lester Bowie) - 41:10
Disc Two
 "Dreaming Of The Master/N'Famadou Boudougou/Odwalla" (Joseph Jarman/Don Moye/Roscoe Mitchell) - 39:00
Recorded March 19, 1979 in Berlin

Note: The Art Ensemble of Chicago discography suggests that the track titles on this release are erroneous and that the correct listing should be:

Disc One
 "Peter and Judith" (Roscoe Mitchell) - 32.20
 "Nonaah (Mitchell) - 6:28
 "Old" (Mitchell) - 2:30
Disc Two
 "Bass Solo" (Malachi Favors) - 5:27
 "Tutankhamun" (Favors) - 21:53
 "Barnyard Scuffel Shuffel" (Lester Bowie) - 2:40
 "N'Famadou Boudougou" (Don Moye) - 4:40
 "Odwalla/Theme" (Mitchell) - 4:20

Personnel 
Lester Bowie: trumpet, percussion instruments
Malachi Favors Maghostut: bass, percussion instruments, vocals
Joseph Jarman: saxophones, clarinets, percussion instruments
Roscoe Mitchell: saxophones, clarinets, flute, percussion instruments
Don Moye: drums, percussion

References 

Art Ensemble of Chicago live albums
1979 live albums
West Wind Records live albums